Ramakant Yadav (born 11 September 1968)  is a professor of Neurology and Yash Bharti Award winner who is working at Uttar Pradesh University of Medical Sciences, Saifai.

Education and career
He completed his M.B.B.S. in 1992 and M.D. (Medicine) in 1998 from Sarojini Naidu Medical College, Agra of Agra University (Dr. Bhimrao Ambedkar University), Agra. Later he joined Sanjay Gandhi Postgraduate Institute of Medical Sciences, Lucknow and got D.M. (Neurology) degree in 2006. He became a fellow of Indian Association of Clinical Medicine in 2008. He joined U.P. Rural Institute of Medical Sciences, now known as Uttar Pradesh University of Medical Sciences, Saifai as an Assistant Professor in 2006 and now working as a Professor there. In 2016 he was awarded Yash Bharti Award, the highest civilian award of the state (Uttar Pradesh). In 2020, he became Fellow of the Royal College of Physicians of Edinburgh. In May 2021 he became vice-chancellor of Uttar Pradesh University of Medical Sciences and served as vice-chancellor till January 2022.

References

External links
Ramakant Yadav at ResearchGate
Ramakant Yadav at Google Scholar

Living people
Heads of universities and colleges in India
20th-century Indian medical doctors
Medical doctors from Uttar Pradesh
Indian medical academics
Indian medical educators
Fellows of the Royal College of Physicians of Edinburgh
Sarojini Naidu Medical College alumni
Dr. Bhimrao Ambedkar University alumni
Sanjay Gandhi Postgraduate Institute of Medical Sciences alumni
Academic staff of Uttar Pradesh University of Medical Sciences
People from Etah
1968 births